Diamond City was a chain of over 14 shopping centers located throughout the nation of Japan. Diamond City shopping centers were owned and operated by Diamond City Co., Ltd.

Diamond City Co., Ltd. had been in operation since 1969. The company was merged into Æon Group in August 2008.

Corporate history

Founding
Diamond City Co., Ltd. was founded on the March 20, 1969.

Personnel
As of February 28, 2006, Diamond City Co., Ltd. employed 247 personnel.

Shareholders
As of February 28, 2006, Diamond City Co., Ltd. had 4,653 shareholders.

Corporate strategy

Diamond City's corporate strategy centered on constructing, not just shopping centers, but communities.  Their goal was to provide a range of services that create a unique way of life for the communities surrounding their shopping centers.

Social responsibility
Diamond City had defined, contributing to the sustainable development of local communities, to be their corporate social responsibility .

Environmental Policy
There were four parts to Diamond City's stated Environmental Policy.

1. Throughout Diamond City's activities they are working to minimize the load on the environment and to protect the environment and prevent pollution.

2. In Diamond City's protection activities through business activities they try for continual improvement by setting goals and targets which are periodically revised.

3. Diamond City complies with the requirements of the regulations concerning environmental protection.

4. In addition to carrying out and sustaining Diamond City's policy, they have made their policy well known to all of their employees.

Development Flow
Diamond City's Development Strategy was a four-part process: Research and Marketing, Planning, Construction, and SC (Shopping Center) Opening

Management

Chairman: Naoki Hayashi
  
Chief Executive Officer,(CEO) : Yozo Tai

Senior Managing Director: Chitoshi Yamanaka

Managing Director: Makoto Sakamoto

Managing Directors: Kenzo Fujitsuka and Yoshishige Ikeda

Directors: Motoya Okada, Masayuki Yoda, Masahiro Sakabe, Masayuki Moro, and Masato Murai

Standing Auditor: Aritsune Hayashi (full-time)

Auditors: Hisateru Taniuchi, Seiji Fujii, Norimitsu Yamaguchi

Location

Offices
Diamond City Co., Limited's Head Office was located within the Shibuya Minami Tokyu Building in Tokyo's busy Shibuya district.
Address: 4F, Shibuya Minami Tokyu Building 12-18, Shibuya 3-chome, Shibuya, Tokyo 150-0002, Japan

Diamond City Co., Ltd. also maintained an office within the Kurabo Annex Building in Osaka.

Address: 12F, Kurabo Annex Building 4-11, Kyutaro-machi 2-chome, Chuo-ku, Osaka.

Shopping Centers

References

Retail companies of Japan
Retail companies established in 1969